The 1984–85 Primera División B was the second category of the Spanish basketball league system during the 1984–85 season

Format 
14 teams played this season.

League of 14 teams, the first three are promoted to the Liga ACB, the last four are relegated to the Second Division.

Teams

Promotion and relegation (pre-season) 
A total of 14 teams contested the league, including 6 sides from the 1983–84 season, three relegated from the 1983–84 ACB, four promoted from the Segunda División and one Wild Cards.

Teams relegated from Liga ACB
Peñas Huesca
Hospitalet ATO
EB Manresa

Teams promoted from Segunda División
CB Tizona
Claret Mútua Guanarteme
Caja Guadalajara
Caja Bilbao

Wild Cards
Maristas de Málaga

Teams that resigned to participate
UER Pineda

Venues and locations

Regular season

References

External links
League at JM Almenzar website
hispaligas.net

Primera División B de Baloncesto
1984–85 in Spanish basketball
Second level Spanish basketball league seasons